Manoj Kumar Tiwary  (born 14 November 1985) is an Indian cricketer and politician. He is a right-handed batsman who bowls occasional leg break. Tiwary represents Bengal in domestic cricket and played for Delhi Daredevils, Kolkata Knight Riders, Kings XI Punjab and Rising Pune Supergiants in the Indian Premier League. He played One Day Internationals and Twenty20 Internationals for the Indian national cricket team. In 2021, he joined All India Trinamool Congress political party and was elected to the West Bengal Legislative Assembly later in the year.

Career
Tiwary plays as an aggressive right-handed batsman. He made his international debut against Australia in the 2007–08 Commonwealth Bank Series in which he scored only 2 runs in his only innings. He was later included in the India team for the West Indies tour of 2011, as a replacement for Yuvraj Singh, who opted out of the series due to a lung infection. Manoj Tiwary played the 4th and 5th ODI in the series. He later got picked for England's tour of India in October. He played in the 5th ODI and got 24 runs. He also played the only T20 and scored 15 runs. Tiwary was subsequently named in the squad for the ODI's against West Indies in November–December. He played in the 5th ODI at Chennai when India was down by 2 wickets for only 1 run in the very first over of the match. Tiwary then went on build a solid innings which got him his scoring maiden ODI century (104 not out) despite having cramps and retired soon after getting his century. Eventually India won the match by 34 runs and he was awarded the Man-Of-The-Match for this match-winning knock. Even after the unbeaten century, Tiwary was made to sit in the reserves for 14 successive matches following the century. However, he made an auspicious comeback as an all-rounder replacing leg spinner Rahul Sharma against Sri Lanka at Colombo as he took 4/61 from his 10 overs with his leg-breaks to restrict the hosts to 251/8. He took the wickets of Dinesh Chandimal, Angelo Mathews, Jeevan Mendis and Thisara Perera, and followed it with a fighting 21 from 38 at a tough time coming at 60/3. India eventually won the match as Virat Kohli scored an unbeaten ton.

Tiwary also was picked for the Commonwealth Bank tri-series against Australia and Sri Lanka, but he didn't play any matches. Manoj Tiwary was again selected in the Indian team for the Asia Cup 2012 where again he didn't play any matches. Tiwary was also selected for the lone T20 against South Africa which was played celebrating 150 years of settlement of Indians in South Africa.

In October 2017, Tiwary played in his 100th first-class cricket match, in the fixture between Bengal and Chhattisgarh in the 2017–18 Ranji Trophy.

Tiwary was the leading run-scorer for Bengal in the 2018–19 Vijay Hazare Trophy, with 366 runs in nine matches. In October 2018, he was named in India B's squad for the 2018–19 Deodhar Trophy. In November 2018, batting for Bengal against Madhya Pradesh in the 2018–19 Ranji Trophy, Tiwary scored his fifth double-century in first-class cricket. In January 2020, in the 2019–20 Ranji Trophy, he scored his maiden triple century in first-class cricket, with an unbeaten 303 runs.

Indian Premier League
Tiwary was signed by Delhi Daredevils in the initial seasons of the Indian Premier League. He was traded to the Kolkata Knight Riders in exchange for Moises Henriques before the 2010 IPL season. In the auction for 4th edition of the Indian Premier League, he was signed by the Kolkata Knight Riders. He scored the winning runs for Kolkata in the final of 2012 competition.

In February 2017, Tiwary was bought by the Rising Pune Supergiants team for the 2017 Indian Premier League and in January 2018, he was bought by the Kings XI Punjab in the 2018 IPL auction.

Political career
Tiwary joined Mamata Banerjee's All India Trinamool Congress party in February 2021. He was selected as a candidate for the 2021 West Bengal Legislative Assembly election in Shibpur (Vidhan Sabha constituency), winning the seat and is a Member of the Legislative Assembly of West Bengal. In the Third Banerjee ministry he was appointed a minister of state for Affairs of Sports and Youth.

References

External links

 
 Manoj Tiwary's profile page on Wisden
 Manoj Tiwary Official Website

1985 births
Living people
People from Howrah
Bengal cricketers
Indian cricketers
India One Day International cricketers
India Twenty20 International cricketers
Delhi Capitals cricketers
Kolkata Knight Riders cricketers
East Zone cricketers
India Blue cricketers
India Green cricketers
India Red cricketers
Abahani Limited cricketers